Halcott Grange No. 881, also known as Green Valley Grange, is a historic Grange building located at Halcott in Greene County, New York.  It was built in 1889 and is a -story, rectangular gable-roofed structure. It features a prominent portico and cupola with Italianate brackets.  It was originally built as a creamery and converted for use as a Grange after 1914.

It was listed on the National Register of Historic Places in 2000. The Halcott Town Board holds its meetings there, making it the town hall for practical purposes.

References

Grange buildings on the National Register of Historic Places in New York (state)
Grange organizations and buildings in New York (state)
Queen Anne architecture in New York (state)
Cultural infrastructure completed in 1889
Buildings and structures in Greene County, New York
National Register of Historic Places in Greene County, New York